Stephen Vizinczey, originally István Vizinczey (12 May 1933 – 18 August 2021) was a Hungarian-Canadian writer.

Early career and influences 
Vizinczey was born in Káloz, Hungary. His first published works were poems which appeared in George Lukacs's Budapest magazine Forum in 1949, when the writer was 16. He studied under Lukacs at the University of Budapest and graduated from the city's Academy of Theatre and Film Arts in 1956. He wrote at that time two plays, The Last Word and Mama, which were banned by the Hungarian Communist regime. He took part in the Hungarian Revolution of 1956, and after a short stay in Italy, ended up in Canada speaking only 50 words of English, and eventually taking Canadian citizenship. He learned English writing scripts for Canada's National Film Board and the CBC. He edited Canada's short-lived literary magazine, Exchange. In 1966 he moved to London.

Vizinczey cited his literary heroes as Pushkin, Gogol, Dostoevsky, Balzac, Stendhal and Kleist. His best-known works were the novels In Praise of Older Women (1965) and An Innocent Millionaire (1983).

In Praise of Older Women
In Praise of Older Women: the amorous recollections of András Vajda is a Bildungsroman whose young narrator has sexual encounters with women in their thirties and forties in Hungary, Italy, and Canada. "The book is dedicated to older women and is addressed to young men--and the connection between the two is my proposition" is the book's epigraph. Kildare Dobbs wrote in Saturday Night, "Here is this Hungarian rebel who in 1957 could scarcely speak a word of our language and who even today speaks it with an impenetrable accent and whose name moreover we can't pronounce, and he has the gall to place himself, with his first book and in his thirty-third year, among the masters of plain English prose..."

In 2001 it was translated for the first time into French, and became a best-seller in France. It has twice been made into a movie: a 1978 Canadian production starring Tom Berenger as Andras Vajda, and a subsequent 1997 Spanish production featuring Faye Dunaway as Condesa.

In 2010, the book was reissued as a Penguin Modern Classic.

An Innocent Millionaire
First published in 1983, An Innocent Millionaire tells the story of Mark Niven, the son of an American actor who makes an uncertain living in Europe. "Mankind, we are told, is divided into the haves and the have-nots, but there are those who both have the goods and do not, and they live the tensest lives." The boy who spends his childhood in various countries "has no emotional address" and once financial pressures led to the divorce of his parents, he becomes enchanted with the idea of finding a Spanish treasure ship. He finds both love and the treasure ship, but the fortune turns into a nightmare and his happiness with a married woman ends in tragedy.

The novel was praised by critics including Graham Greene and Anthony Burgess. Burgess wrote in Punch that Vizinczey could "teach the English how to write English", praised the novel's "prose style and its sly apophthegms, as well as in the solidity of its characters, good and detestable alike." Burgess ended his review by saying: "I was entertained but also deeply moved: here is a novel set bang in the middle of our corrupt world that, in some curious way, breathes a kind of desperate hope." The London Literary Review called the novel "an authentic social epic, which reunites, after an estrangement of nearly a century, intellectual and moral edification with exuberant entertainment."

Essays
Vizinczey wrote two books of literary, philosophical and political essays: The Rules of Chaos (1969) and Truth and Lies in Literature (1985).

Bibliography
In Praise of Older Women (1966)
The Rules of Chaos (1969) 
An Innocent Millionaire (1983)
Truth and Lies in Literature (1985)
The Man with the Magic Touch (1994)
If Only (2016)
3 Wishes (2020)

References

External links

Official website
Stephen Vizinczey's Blog
Truth and Lies in Literature in Google Book Search.
Official Facebook page
 Review of the new edition of In Praise of Older Women by journalist Will Robinson

1933 births
2021 deaths
People from Fejér County
Hungarian essayists
Canadian male essayists
Hungarian male novelists
Canadian male novelists
Canadian literary critics
Hungarian literary critics
Hungarian emigrants to Canada
20th-century Canadian novelists
20th-century Canadian essayists
20th-century Canadian male writers
21st-century Canadian novelists
21st-century Canadian essayists
21st-century Canadian male writers
20th-century Hungarian novelists
20th-century Hungarian male writers
21st-century Hungarian novelists
21st-century Hungarian male writers